The 2017 Grand Est Open 88 was a professional tennis tournament played on outdoor clay courts. It was the eleventh edition of the tournament and was part of the 2017 ITF Women's Circuit. It took place in Contrexéville, France, on 10–16 July 2017.

Singles main draw entrants

Seeds 

 1 Rankings as of 3 July 2017.

Other entrants 
The following players received a wildcard into the singles main draw:
  Alexandra Dulgheru
  Marine Partaud
  Virginie Razzano
  Harmony Tan

The following players received entry from the qualifying draw:
  Michaela Hončová
  Elixane Lechemia
  Irina Ramialison
  Gaia Sanesi

Champions

Singles

 Johanna Larsson def.  Tatjana Maria, 6–1, 6–4

Doubles
 
 Anastasiya Komardina /  Elitsa Kostova def.  Manon Arcangioli /  Sara Cakarevic, 6–3, 6–4

External links 
 2017 Grand Est Open 88 at ITFtennis.com
 Official website

2017 ITF Women's Circuit
2017 in French tennis
Grand Est Open 88